"Window in the Skies" is a song by Irish rock band U2 and is one of two new songs featured on their 2006 compilation album U218 Singles. It was released on 1 January 2007 as the album's second single. It was recorded in September 2006 at Abbey Road Studios in London and produced by Rick Rubin. The song was nominated for a Grammy Award for Best Pop Performance by a Duo or Group with Vocals.

Music videos

There are two different music videos for this song.

U2 released the first music video for "Window in the Skies" on 20 November 2006, after the completion of their Australian leg of the Vertigo tour.  A second version of the video was released a few weeks later.

The first video, directed by Gary Koepke, is a montage that includes nearly 100 clips taken from footage from the previous 50 years of other famous musicians performing in concert. The clips were selected and edited together so that either the lip movements or the finger movements of the musicians, who actually were performing other songs, match up with either the lyrics or the music of the U2 song. The musicians in order of appearance are: Frank Zappa, Billie Holiday, Simon & Garfunkel, Roy Orbison, Björk, Ella Fitzgerald, Bob Marley, Talking Heads, Louis Armstrong, David Bowie, Lou Reed, Frank Sinatra, John Stirratt, Kanye West, Mick Jones, Nat King Cole, Paul Cook, Pete Townshend, The Rolling Stones, Nina Simone, Sam Cooke, Marvin Gaye, Ozzy Osbourne, The Temptations, Sharleen Spiteri, Elvis Costello, The Ramones, Jimi Hendrix, Nirvana, Joe Strummer, Johnny Cash, Iggy Pop, Radiohead, Mary J. Blige, Jane's Addiction, Elvis Presley, Al Green, Morrissey, Beck, Britney Spears, Elton John, The Police, Wu-Tang Clan, Arcade Fire, Joey Ramone, The Temptations, White Stripes, Funkadelic, Kurt Cobain, U2, Charles Mingus, John Paul Jones, Arcade Fire, Keith Richards, Jimi Hendrix, Bob Dylan, Adam Clayton, Chrissie Hynde, Alicia Keys, Ray Charles, Little Richard, The Beatles, Sam Cooke, Keith Moon, David Bowie, The Beatles, Smokey Robinson, John Lennon, Elvis Presley, Led Zeppelin, Vladimir Horowitz, Ronnie Spector, John Bonham, Queen, Unidentified, Jackie Wilson, Beastie Boys, Fela Kuti, Talking Heads, Public Enemy, MC5, Flavor Flav, U2, Jerry Lee Lewis, Jay-Z, Larry Mullen Jr., Patti Smith, Apollo Sunshine, Stevie Wonder, Nirvana, U2 and Frank Sinatra.

The only confirmed location of the video is the Corner Hotel in Richmond in Melbourne, Australia. The band is featured only very briefly in the crowds as fans.

The second video, directed by Jonas Odell, is another montage. The camera flies through a surreal landscape with floating buildings and still images, mostly of the band from their U2 By U2 autobiography, morphing into each other.

Live performances
The song has only been performed on the fifth leg of U2's Vertigo Tour. The Edge played the song on a Rickenbacker 330-12.

Track listings

Charts

Weekly charts

Year-end charts

See also
 List of Canadian number-one singles of 2001–07
 List of Dutch Top 40 number-one singles of 2007
 List of number-one hits of 2007 (Italy)

References

U2 songs
2006 songs
2007 singles
Canadian Singles Chart number-one singles
Number-one singles in Italy
Dutch Top 40 number-one singles
Mercury Records singles
Song recordings produced by Rick Rubin
Songs written by Bono
Songs written by the Edge
Songs written by Adam Clayton
Songs written by Larry Mullen Jr.
Cultural depictions of Elvis Presley
Cultural depictions of the Beatles
Cultural depictions of David Bowie
Cultural depictions of Louis Armstrong
Cultural depictions of Billie Holiday
Cultural depictions of Frank Sinatra
Cultural depictions of Fela Kuti
Cultural depictions of the Rolling Stones
Cultural depictions of Bob Marley
Cultural depictions of Jimi Hendrix
Cultural depictions of Bob Dylan
Cultural depictions of Freddie Mercury
Cultural depictions of James Brown